Objectory Systems was a software company based in Sweden that was instrumental in the development of Object-oriented program design. Founded in 1987 by Ivar Jacobson, the company developed Objectory, an object-oriented development method which was an extension of what is known as the Ericsson Approach, a modeling language developed at Ericsson. This language featured state charts with activity diagrams, as well as sequence diagrams.

In 1991, Ericsson purchased a substantial amount of the stake in Objectory Systems. As a result, Objectory Systems became known as Objectory AB — a subsidiary of Ericsson. In 1995, Rational Software Corporation acquired the subsidiary.

See also
Rational Software
Object-oriented software engineering

External links
What You Didn’t Know About RUP a Jacobson presentation about RUP — Rational Unified Process
Use Cases: Yesterday, Today, and Tomorrow

Software companies of Sweden
Companies established in 1987
Ericsson